Sydney—Victoria is a federal electoral district in Nova Scotia, Canada, that has been represented in the House of Commons of Canada since 1997.

It was created in 1996 from parts of Cape Breton—The Sydneys, Cape Breton—East Richmond and Cape Breton Highlands—Canso ridings.

Cape Breton—Canso is the only adjacent riding.

Demographics

According to the Canada 2011 Census; 2013 representation

Ethnic groups: 88.5 White, 8.9% Aboriginal, 1.1% Black 
Languages: 92.9% English, 4.6% Mi'kmaq, 1.2% French
Religions: 90.7% Christian (62.8% Catholic, 8.3% United Church, 7.5% Anglican, 4.0% Presbyterian, 1.9% Baptist, 6.2% Other), 8.0% No religion 
Median income (2010): $23,704 
Average income (2010): $30,202

According to the Canada 2016 Census
 Languages: (2016) 93.3% English, 4.1% Mi’kmaq, 0.9% French, 0.3% Mandarin, 0.1% Arabic, 0.1% Urdu, 0.1% German, 0.1% Tagalog, 0.1% Dutch, 0.1% Cantonese, 0.1% Italian, 0.1% Scottish Gaelic

Geography
It consists of:
 The County of Victoria;
 the northern part of the County of Inverness, i.e., the part lying north of the southern boundary of Cape Breton Highlands National Park; and
 the northwestern part of the Cape Breton Regional Municipality, i.e., the part lying northwest of a line drawn northeast from Bras d'Or Lake to the northeast extremity of East Bay, due north to Portage Brook, northeast along Portage Brook, Blacketts Lake, the Sydney River, Highway 125, Trunk 4 (Grand Lake Road), Northwest Brook, the western shoreline of Grand Lake, the DEVCO Railway, and its northern branch (running towards the Community of Dominion) to its second intersection with Northwest Brook (north of Grand Lake), and then north and northeast along that brook, Lingan Bay and Indian Bay to the Atlantic Ocean.

This riding will maintain its boundaries as per the 2012 federal electoral redistribution.

Members of Parliament

This riding has elected the following Members of Parliament:

Election results

2021 general election

2019 general election

2015 general election

2011 general election

2008 general election

2006 general election

2004 general election

2000 general election

1997 general election

See also
 List of Canadian federal electoral districts
 Past Canadian electoral districts

References

Notes

External links
 Riding history for Sydney–Victoria (1996– ) from the Library of Parliament

Nova Scotia federal electoral districts
Politics of the Cape Breton Regional Municipality
Inverness County, Nova Scotia
Victoria County, Nova Scotia